Awashi Dam is an earthfill dam on local river near Dapoli, Ratnagiri district, in the state of Maharashtra in India.

Specifications

Purpose
 Irrigation

See also
 Dams in Maharashtra
 List of reservoirs and dams in India

References

Dams in Ratnagiri district
Dams completed in 1999
1999 establishments in Maharashtra